Hinse is a surname. Notable people with the surname include:

 André Hinse (born 1945), Canadian ice hockey player
 Gordon Hinse (born 1987), Canadian football player
 Réjean Hinse, Canadian who was wrongfully convicted of armed robbery